Astrid Hochstetter (born 4 August 1979) is a German former figure skater who competed in ladies' singles. She placed 14th at the 1994 World Junior Championships. In 1996, she became the German national senior champion and was sent to the European Championships, where she placed 16th.

Hochstetter was coached by Peter Meyer and belonged to ERC Westfalen in Dortmund. She retired from competition in January 1999.

Competitive highlights 
GP: Champions Series (Grand Prix)

References 

1979 births
German female single skaters
Living people
People from Kirchheim unter Teck
Sportspeople from Stuttgart (region)
20th-century German women
21st-century German women